Black Torch is a Japanese manga series written and illustrated by Tsuyoshi Takaki. It was serialized in Shueisha's monthly magazine Jump Square from December 2016 to March 2018, and later on the digital platform Shōnen Jump+ from April to July 2018. Its chapters were compiled in five tankōbon volumes. In North America, the manga was licensed for English language release by Viz Media.

Plot
Jiro Azuma is a teenage punk, trained in the art of the ninja, who has the incredible ability to talk to animals. Despite this, he was constantly bullied as a child for talking to animals; he could only find solace with other animals, such as his dog Nachi. One day, Jiro is led into the woods by some birds and encounters a gravely injured cat. He nurses the cat back to health, who is shocked to find out that Jiro can understand him. The cat reveals himself as Rago of the Black Star of Doom, an immortal mononoke, or evil spirit. He reveals that he was attacked by other mononoke for refusing to help them. Later that night, Rago attempts to escape from Jiro's house, but they are attacked by one of the mononoke Rago encountered earlier. This mononoke kills Jiro by stabbing him through the chest with his immense claws. Feeling pity and indebted to Jiro for saving him earlier, Rago fuses with Jiro to give him a second chance at life. With their combined power, they kill the mononoke, but are then taken into custody by the Bureau of Espionage. The two later join the Bureau in order to stop more mononoke in the future.

Publication
Black Torch is written and illustrated by Tsuyoshi Takaki. It was serialized in Shueisha's monthly shōnen manga magazine Jump Square from December 31, 2016 to March 2, 2018. It was then transferred to Shueisha's Shōnen Jump+ online platform, being serialized for three consecutive issues from April 11 to July 11, 2018. Shueisha published its 19 individual chapters in five tankōbon volumes, released from April 4, 2017 to August 3, 2018.

In North America, Viz Media announced the English language release of the manga in July 2017. The title has been available on its Shonen Jump digital platform since December 2018. The five volumes were released from August 7, 2018 to August 6, 2019.

Volume list

Reception
In 2019, Black Torch was one of manga titles that ranked on the "Top 10 Graphic Novels for Teens" by the Young Adult Library Services Association (YALSA) of the American Library Association.

Rebecca Silverman of Anime News Network ranked the first volume as a B. Silverman commended the characters' dynamic and its story devices; however, she criticized it for "doing a lot right off the bat" and for the lack of character development. Silverman found Takaki's art style similar to Tite Kubo's, of Bleach fame, and to other Shōnen Jump authors, but she said that it does not feel like an imitation of any of them. Silverman concluded: "If you're in the mood for a new shounen action series, this is one worth checking out, because once it works out its issues, it could definitely go places".

See also
 Heart Gear—Another manga series by the same author

References

Further reading

External links
 
 

Action anime and manga
Ninja in anime and manga
Science fiction anime and manga
Shōnen manga
Shueisha manga
Supernatural anime and manga
Viz Media manga